This is a list of Benedictine Ravens players who have been selected in the NFL Draft.

Key

Selections

References

Lists of National Football League draftees by college football team

Benedictine Ravens NFL Draft